Vuhlehirska power station (also known as Vuhlehirska TES) is a coal-fueled thermal power station located in Svitlodarsk, Ukraine. It consists of 7 units with a total power output of 3,600 MW and was put in service between 1972 and 1977. Since August 1995 the power station is operated by Centrenergo.

History

On 29 March 2013, four power units of the station were destroyed as a result of a major fire in which one employee was killed, and eight injured workers were hospitalized.

According to information published in Compressor Tech magazine on 22 March 2022 during the 2022 Russian invasion of Ukraine, the pipeline was damaged by artillery shelling, but technicians were able to perform some light repairs on it. It was also reported that the war had disrupted its network in multiple spots.

On 26 July 2022, during the Eastern Ukraine offensive, Russian, DNR and LNR forces took control over the power station completely.

See also 

 List of chimneys
 Battle of Svitlodarsk

References

Svitlodarsk
Coal-fired power stations in Ukraine
Chimneys in Ukraine
Buildings and structures destroyed during the 2022 Russian invasion of Ukraine